Shahr-e Bijar (also Romanized as Shahr-e Bījār; also known as Shahr-e Bījār Rūdsarā) is a village in Blukat Rural District, Rahmatabad and Blukat District, Rudbar County, Gilan Province, Iran. At the 2006 census, its population was 894, in 232 families.

References 

Populated places in Rudbar County